Saint Berlinda (also known as Bellaude; died 702 AD) was a Benedictine nun of noble descent. Her feast day is 3 February. According to legend she was a niece of Saint Amandus, and was disinherited by her father, Count Odelard, after he became sick with leprosy and believed that she would not take proper care of him.

Berlinda fled to a convent at Moorsel, near Aalst, and became a nun. After her father died, she became a hermit at Meerbeke, where her father had been buried. Her tradition states that she spent her life helping the poor and suffering.

References

Literature
 Van Droogenbroeck, F. J., 'Paltsgraaf Wigerik van Lotharingen, inspiratiebron voor de legendarische graaf Witger in de Vita Gudilae', Eigen Schoon en De Brabander 93 (2010) 113–136.
 Van Droogenbroeck, F. J., 'Hugo van Lobbes (1033-1053), auteur van de Vita Amalbergae viduae, Vita S. Reinildis en Vita S. Berlendis', Eigen Schoon en De Brabander 94 (2011) 367–402.

External links
 Berlinda at Saints.SQPN.com

7th-century births
702 deaths
Belgian Roman Catholic saints
Belgian hermits
7th-century Christian saints
Year of birth unknown
Benedictine nuns
Christian female saints of the Middle Ages
People from East Flanders